Greg Lawson (born 1944) is an American photographer currently based in Sedona, Arizona and San Diego, California. As an avid natural history supporter and enthusiast, Lawson focuses primarily on nature, wildlife, travel, and landscape photography. Lawson's works have been featured in many newspapers across the United States, such as the Santa Cruz Sentinel, Santa Barbara News-Press, The San Diego Union-Tribune, Sedona Red Rock News, Verde Independent, Honolulu Star-Bulletin, among others.

Life and career
Lawson's interest in photography began at the age of 14 when he received a camera from his mother in New York City. His interest in the medium never waned, and Lawson built up an image-based art career spanning more than five decades. The image collection includes work from all fifty of the United States and all seven of Earth's continents, and have been produced using camera formats ranging from large format film to modern digital.

Greg Lawson has operated fourteen art galleries in the USA, and currently operates two galleries in Sedona, Arizona and one in La Jolla, California that have become popular attractions. The Gallereum in West Sedona, Arizona serves visitors as a museum featuring his historic cameras and a gallery exhibiting global images.

Lawson produces his image-based art, which he describes as "paintings with light" in open editions, limited editions and artist proof editions on a variety of media.

Some of Lawson's photography techniques include the aluminum transfer method, where images are produced on aluminum sheets.

Media
Lawson’s broadcast portal, Terrestrial Public Media, historically produced a weekly talk show called Skylight broadcast in Phoenix, Arizona and Seattle, Washington. Skylight featured arts-related interviews and also discussed the philosophy of art, including philosophical topics such as Lawson's "Principles Model", a social management ideal that recognizes how humanity is well-served when guided by basic inherent principles such as integrity, empathy, and loyalty.

One of Lawson's publishing enterprises, Artsource Media, produces a bi-annual magazine, Artsource Arizona, focusing on the arts in the state of Arizona. The first issue was selected as the winner for new magazine design in the publishing industry at the annual Folio Awards in New York City in October 2021.

Books
Lawson has authored more than 50 books on natural history, geography, and travel. Many of the books feature landscape and wildlife photography in the American Southwest, while others focus on national parks. Some of his selected books are:

2017. Heaven Sent.
2013. Sedona - The Nature of the Place. 
2009. Fine As San Diego. 
2009. Star Struck: Texas Impressions. 
2008. California in the Beginning. 
2007. One For All: an introduction to the principles model. Carl Solway Gallery.
2007. Topical Storm. Dody Books.
2006. AZ Is: Arizona Imagery. 
2005. Natural States. 
2005. Sedona: The Nature of the Place. 
2005. Americana Photography. 
1990. Oh California. 
1989. Palm Springs Oasis. 
1987. San Diego County. 
1985. San Diego. 
1984. Los Angeles. 
1983. California. 
1981. Hawaii. 
1981. Beauty Spot Santa Barbara''.

References

External links
Greg Lawson Galleries (official site)
Art Source Media

1944 births
Living people
American photojournalists
20th-century American photographers
21st-century American photographers
Photographers from California
Photographers from Arizona
Photographers from Pennsylvania